The Wong Tai Sin District Council is one of 18 such district councils in Hong Kong, representing the Wong Tai Sin District. The Wong Tai Sin District Council currently consists of 25 members, each elected from one of 25 constituencies. The latest election was held on 24 November 2019.

History
The Wong Tai Sin District Council was established on 6 May 1981 under the name of the Wong Tai Sin District Board as the result of the colonial Governor Murray MacLehose's District Administration Scheme reform. The District Board was partly elected with the ex-officio Urban Council members, as well as members appointed by the Governor until 1994 when last Governor Chris Patten refrained from appointing any member.

The Wong Tai Sin District Board became Wong Tai Sin Provisional District Board after the Hong Kong Special Administrative Region (HKSAR) was established in 1997 with the appointment system being reintroduced by Chief Executive Tung Chee-hwa. The Wong Tai Sin District Council was established on 1 January 2000 after the first District Council election in 1999. The council has become fully elected when the appointed seats were abolished in 2011 after the modified constitutional reform proposal was passed by the Legislative Council in 2010.

Due to the district's industrial character, the Wong Tai Sin District Council has been a stronghold for the pro-Beijing traditional leftists, returning one of its first directly elected Legislative Councillors Chan Yuen-han, who was member of the Hong Kong Federation of Trade Unions (FTU) and represented the Democratic Alliance for the Betterment of Hong Kong (DAB). The pro-democrats also had their influence in the district, seeing Conrad Lam of the United Democrats of Hong Kong elected to the Legislative Council in 1985 and 1991.

The district also bred high-profile politicians such as Andrew To, the youngest member elected to the District Board 1991, member of the United Democrats and the Democratic Party, secretary-general of The Frontier and chairman of the League of Social Democrats (LSD) who held his seat until his defeat in the 2011 election with the LSD being wiped out in the district. Democratic Party chairman Wu Chi-wai was also a long-time Wong Tai Sin District Councillor, representing King Fu from 1999 to 2019.

The pro-democrats scored a historic landslide victory in the 2019 election amid the massive pro-democracy protests by taking all the seats in the council. The pro-Beijing councillors were completely wiped out as a result, with Democratic Party becoming the largest party.

Political control
Since 1982 political control of the council has been held by the following parties:

Political makeup

Elections are held every four years.

District result maps

Members represented
Starting from 1 January 2020:

Leadership

Chairs
Since 1985, the chairman is elected by all the members of the board:

Vice Chairs

Notes

References

 
Wong Tai Sin District
Districts of Hong Kong